This list includes flags that either have been in use or are currently used by France, French Overseas Collectivites, the Sui Generis Collectivity and the French Overseas Territory.

The French Society of Vexillology is the authority on the flying of flags in France and maintains the only official register of flags for the country. It was established in 1985 and as part of the Comité des travaux historiques et scientifiques operates under the authority of the Minister of Higher Education, Research and Innovation. The Breton Vexillology Society holds a similar role within Brittany.

National flags

Standards

Presidential Standards

Ministers Standards

Royal Standards

Military
Flags of the French Military

Army
Flags of the French Army

Navy
Flags of the French Navy

Air Force
Flags of the French Air Force

Civil Ensign

Vexillology Associations

Regional and territorial flags

City flags

Largest cities

Political flags

Monarchist flags
These flags have a long tradition among French monarchists.

Separatist movements flags

Ethnic groups flags
Many cultural groups, which identify themselves mostly by language, use traditional flag of the regions of its origin. Such flags are not listed here.

Historical flags

Kingdom of France

Colonial flags

Alsace

Brittany

Burgundy

Corsica

Normandy

Occitania

Savoy

French Guiana

French Polynesia

Austral Islands

Gambier Islands

Marquesas Islands

Society Islands

Tuamotus

Martinique

Wallis and Futuna

Other historical flags

Flag proposal

Associations

French shipping company

French yacht clubs

Fictional flags

See also
List of Breton flags
List of Corsican flags
List of flags of Île-de-France
List of Occitan flags
List of flags of Pays de la Loire

References

External links

 
 French flag at the Élysée website
 The French Society of Vexillology
 World Flag Database